Elvira Zurabovna Todua (born 31 January 1986) is an Abkhazian, Georgian, Russian football goalkeeper who plays for CSKA Moscow of the Russian Women's Football Championship.

Todua became the Russia women's national football team's first-choice goalkeeper after making her debut in 2003. She competed at the UEFA Women's Championships in 2009 and 2013.

Club career
With Rossiyanka she has won two Top Division titles and two Russian Women's Cup winners' medals. She has also represented the club in the UEFA Women's Champions League. She is a first-choice penalty-taker in her club, and scored 4 goals in the seasons 2016–2018.

International career

Russia
Todua made her debut for the senior Russia women's national football team in a 2003 friendly against China. She was named in the tournament All-Star Team at the 2004 FIFA U-19 Women's World Championship.

She was part of the victorious Russian team at the 2005 UEFA Women's Under-19 Championship in Hungary. When the final against France went to a penalty shootout, Todua scored Russia's sixth penalty herself then saved Laure Boulleau's attempt to secure the win.

In qualifying for UEFA Women's Euro 2009, Todua played in Russia's play–off win over Scotland. She was named in national coach Igor Shalimov's squad for the final tournament. After missing the first two matches with a knee injury, Todua was restored to the team for Russia's final match: a 2–0 defeat by Italy. She was left disappointed by Russia's early exit.

Four years later Todua overcame a shoulder injury to take her place in the squad for UEFA Women's Euro 2013 in Sweden. Russia lost 3–1 to France but drew 1–1 with both England and Spain. They were eliminated after losing out to Denmark on the drawing of lots.

Todua took painkilling injections in order to play but underwent surgery on her injured shoulder after the tournament.

On 13 April 2021, she played her 100th match for Russia against Portugal in the UEFA Women's Euro 2022 qualifying play-offs.

Abkhazia
In June 2012, Todua made a late substitute appearance in the male Abkhazia national football team's first ever match: a 2–1 friendly win over Russian club FC Krasnodar.

Personal life
Todua was born in Tkvarcheli, but moved to Novocherkassk in Russia when she was seven, due to the War in Abkhazia (1992–93).

In 2011 Todua's club Rossiyanka attracted attention for a bikini photoshoot. Pin-up girl Todua has also been featured in various magazine modeling assignments. A national newspaper declared her amongst Russia's 20 most beautiful athletes in 2009.

Honours

Club 
WFC Rossiyanka

Top Division (2): 2010, 2011–12
Russian Women's Cup (2): 2009, 2010

International 

Russia

UEFA Women's Under-19 Championship (1): 2005

Individual

FIFA Women's World Under-19 Championship All-Star Team (1): 2004

References

External links
 
 Russian National Team profile 
 Club profile 
 Womenfootball.ru profile 
 Interview on YouTube 

1986 births
Living people
Footballers from Abkhazia
Russian women's footballers
Russia women's international footballers
Russian people of Abkhazian descent
Russian female models
People from Tkvarcheli District
Kubanochka Krasnodar players
CSK VVS Samara (women's football club) players
WFC Rossiyanka players
SKA Rostov-on-Don (women) players
Women's association football goalkeepers
ZFK CSKA Moscow players
FIFA Century Club
Russian Women's Football Championship players